Apoptosis regulator BAX, also known as bcl-2-like protein 4, is a protein that in humans is encoded by the BAX gene. BAX is a member of the Bcl-2 gene family. BCL2 family members form hetero- or homodimers and act as anti- or pro-apoptotic regulators that are involved in a wide variety of cellular activities. This protein forms a heterodimer with BCL2, and functions as an apoptotic activator. This protein is reported to interact with, and increase the opening of, the mitochondrial voltage-dependent anion channel (VDAC), which leads to the loss in membrane potential and the release of cytochrome c. The expression of this gene is regulated by the tumor suppressor P53 and has been shown to be involved in P53-mediated apoptosis.

Structure 

The BAX gene was the first identified pro-apoptotic member of the Bcl-2 protein family. Bcl-2 family members share one or more of the four characteristic domains of homology entitled the Bcl-2 homology (BH) domains (named BH1, BH2, BH3 and BH4), and can form hetero- or homodimers. These domains are composed of nine α-helices, with a hydrophobic α-helix core surrounded by amphipathic helices and a transmembrane C-terminal α-helix anchored to the mitochondrial outer membrane (MOM). A hydrophobic groove formed along the C-terminal of α2 to the N-terminal of α5, and some residues from α8, binds the BH3 domain of other BAX or BCL-2 proteins in its active form. In the protein's inactive form, the groove binds its transmembrane domain, transitioning it from a membrane-bound to a cytosolic protein. A smaller hydrophobic groove formed by the α1 and α6 helices is located on the opposite side of the protein from the major groove, and may serve as a BAX activation site.

Orthologs of the BAX gene have been identified in most mammals for which complete genome data are available.

Function 

In healthy mammalian cells, the majority of BAX is found in the cytosol, but upon initiation of apoptotic signaling, Bax undergoes a conformational shift.  Upon induction of apoptosis, BAX becomes organelle membrane-associated, and in particular, mitochondrial membrane associated.

BAX is believed to interact with, and induce the opening of the mitochondrial voltage-dependent anion channel, VDAC. Alternatively, growing evidence also suggests that activated BAX and/or Bak form an oligomeric pore, MAC in the MOM (mitochondrial outer membrane). This results in the release of cytochrome c and other pro-apoptotic factors from the mitochondria, often referred to as mitochondrial outer membrane permeabilization, leading to activation of caspases. This defines a direct role for BAX in mitochondrial outer membrane permeabilization. BAX activation is stimulated by various abiotic factors, including heat, hydrogen peroxide, low or high pH, and mitochondrial membrane remodeling. In addition, it can become activated by binding BCL-2, as well as non-BCL-2 proteins such as p53 and Bif-1. Conversely, BAX can become inactivated by interacting with VDAC2, Pin1, and IBRDC2.

Clinical significance 

The expression of BAX is upregulated by the tumor suppressor protein p53, and BAX has been shown to be involved in p53-mediated apoptosis. The p53 protein is a transcription factor that, when activated as part of the cell's response to stress, regulates many downstream target genes, including BAX. Wild-type p53 has been demonstrated to upregulate the transcription of a chimeric reporter plasmid utilizing the consensus promoter sequence of BAX approximately 50-fold over mutant p53. Thus it is likely that p53 promotes BAX's apoptotic faculties in vivo as a primary transcription factor. However, p53 also has a transcription-independent role in apoptosis. In particular, p53 interacts with BAX, promoting its activation as well as its insertion into the mitochondrial membrane.

Drugs that activate BAX, such as ABT-737, a BH3 mimetic, hold promise as anticancer treatments by inducing apoptosis in cancer cells. For instance, binding of HA-BAD to BCL-xL and concomitant disruption of BAX:BCL-xL interaction was found to partly reverse paclitaxel resistance in human ovarian cancer cells. Meanwhile, excessive apoptosis in such conditions as ischemia reperfusion injury and amyotrophic lateral sclerosis may benefit from drug inhibitors of BAX.

Interactions 

Bcl-2-associated X protein has been shown to interact with:
 Bcl-2, 
 BCL2L1, 
 BCL2A1 
 SH3GLB1, 
 SLC25A4, 
 VDAC1,
 TCTP,
 YWHAQ,
Bid,
Bim,
Puma,
Noxa,
Mfn2,
cholesterol, and
cardiolipin.

See also
 Apoptosis
 Apoptosome
 Bcl-2
 BH3 interacting domain death agonist (BID)
 Caspases
 Cytochrome c
 Noxa
 Mitochondrion
 p53 upregulated modulator of apoptosis (PUMA)

References

External links
 
 
 

Apoptosis
Programmed cell death
Proteins